Lawa Anapaike Airstrip  is an airstrip serving the Wayana village of Kawemhakan on the Lawa River in Suriname. The airstrip of this relatively modern indigenous village is named after its former chief Anapaike.

Charters and destinations 
Charter Airlines serving this airport are:

Incidents and accidents 
 On 29 March 2012 a Blue Wing Airlines Cessna 208B Grand Caravan (PZ-TSK) veered to the left of the runway at the Lawa Anapaike Airstrip hitting some tree stumps during its landing. The airplane was lightly damaged, but all ten occupants, the pilot and nine passengers escaped unhurt.

See also

 List of airports in Suriname
 Transport in Suriname

References

External links
OpenStreetMap - Anapaike

Airports in Suriname
Sipaliwini District